Marian Stanisław Norkowski (17 May 1935 in Toruń – 7 March 2001 in Warsaw) was a Polish football forward, top scorer of the Polish Football League of the 1960 season, with 17 goals. Norkowski began his career in Pomorzanin Toruń, and in 1952 he moved to Polonia Bydgoszcz, where he remained until 1970. With Polonia, he played 7 seasons in the Ekstraklasa, scoring all together 91 goals. He also capped six times for Poland, with one goal. Norkowski was a member of the Polish team for the 1960 Summer Olympics in Rome, but he did not play in any matches. After retiring, he worked as a coach, but without any achievements.

References

External links
 

1935 births
2001 deaths
Polish footballers
Poland international footballers
Ekstraklasa players
Olympic footballers of Poland
Footballers at the 1960 Summer Olympics
Sportspeople from Toruń
Association football forwards
Polonia Bydgoszcz players